Judge Bennett may refer to:

Alfred H. Bennett (born 1965), judge of the United States District Court for the Southern District of Texas
Marion T. Bennett (1914–2000), judge of the United States Court of Appeals for the Federal Circuit
Mark J. Bennett (born 1953), judge of the United States Court of Appeals for the Ninth Circuit
Mark W. Bennett (born 1950), judge of the United States District Court for the Northern District of Iowa
Richard D. Bennett (born 1947), judge of the United States District Court for the District of Maryland

See also
John Bennet (judge) (1553–1627), British judge of the Prerogative Court of Canterbury
Hiram Pitt Bennet (1826–1914), judge of the circuit court of Iowa
Justice Bennett (disambiguation)